Stathmodera densesulcata is a species of beetle in the family Cerambycidae. It was described by Breuning in 1940.

References

Apomecynini
Beetles described in 1940